Han Yerry Tewahangarahken ("He Who Takes Up the Snow Shoe") (1724 – 1794) was also known as Honyery Doxtator. Han Yerry was born into his mother's Wolf clan, as the Iroquois had a matrilineal society with women holding property and hereditary leadership passing through their lines, children took the nationality and clan of their mother, as they gain social status through her.

He became a war chief of the Oneida people and was key during the American Revolutionary War, considered to be one of the most influential leader of the Oneida. Yerry fought in the Battle of Oriskany against Loyalists and other members of the Haudenosaunee. He was married to Tyonajanegen.

Nomenclature 
Han Yerry was thought to have had a German Palatine father. Although this statement is most likely a result of confusion with another family of "Dockstaders" that can trace their line back to Georg Dachstädter, a German Palatine who settled in Upstate New York in 1709. Han Yerry is not in his line and therefore his children most likely adopted the name.

There are also unclear references in documents of the period to a Wolf Clan title Otatshehte, or "Carries a Quiver". It is possible that the surname Dachstädter could have developed as an Anglicization of this title. This was discussed in the online resources of the Oneida nation."Americans feared invasion from Canada throughout much of 1776. Late that year, another Oneida leader brought accurate intelligence indicating there would be no attack that year. Ojistalak was a sachem (holder of a League office) in the Wolf clan. The Oneidas had nine such titles and they carried immense prestige. Ojistalak's title (Otatshete) was considered to be the highest and, as a gifted public speaker (he spoke for the sachems in the council), he was a very influential man among the Oneidas. Strongly pro-American in outlook, Ojistalak had a great deal to do with the pro-American stand of the Oneidas during the war. It is likely that it was Ojistalak who, in 1778, declared his Nation's "unalterable resolution" at every hazard, to hold fast the Covenant Chain with the United States, and with which to be buried in the same grave, or to enjoy the fruits of victory and peace."This word is a variant of Otsistarare (meaning "Grasshopper") which was also a known nickname of Han Yerry. Beginning in the 1780s a Peter Otsistarare, likely Han Yerry's son, is recorded using this name as well. It is possible that the title became hereditary. Like many accounts from this era, the records are fragmentary and sometimes transcribed by indian agents with poor phonetic accuracy to the preservation of indigenous languages.

References

1724 births
1794 deaths
Native Americans in the American Revolution
Oneida people
People of New York (state) in the American Revolution